Monbulla is a locality in the Limestone Coast region of South Australia. It is west of Penola and occupies the eastern part of the Hundred of Monbulla. There is no town centre, and the locality population was 127 at the 2016 census. Monbulla school opened in 1894 but has now closed.

The locality includes the Penola Conservation Park on its western edge. It is crossed by the roads connecting Penola to Clay Wells (towards Robe), Mount Burr (towards Millicent) and Kalangadoo. The Ladbroke Grove Power Station is near the southeastern corner of the locality.

References

Towns in South Australia